= Aerial acrobatics =

Aerial acrobatics may refer to:

- Acrobatics § Aerial, acrobatics performed in the air on a suspended apparatus
- Aerobatics, the practice of flying maneuvers involving aircraft attitudes that are not used in conventional passenger-carrying flights
